Mauro Cardi (born July 22, 1955, in Rome, Italy) is an Italian composer.

Biography
Trained at the "Santa Cecilia" Conservatoire of Rome, under the guidance of Irma Ravinale, Gino Marinuzzi jr., Guido Turchi, he graduated in composition, instrumentation for wind orchestra and choral music. In 1982, he received his first international recognition, winning the "Valentino Bucchi Prize" with Melos, for soprano and orchestra. Crucial was the encounter with Franco Donatoni, with which he furthered his education at the Accademia Nazionale di Santa Cecilia and the Accademia Musicale Chigiana of Siena. In 1984, he attended the Darmstädter Ferienkurse. In the same year his composition Les Masques, Quattro Bagatelle for flute viola and guitar, was awarded the prestigious Gaudeamus Prize in Amsterdam. In 1987, he was selected to represent Italy at the International Rostrum of Composers by UNESCO. In 1988, he won the second prize at the International Competition Gian Francesco Malipiero with In Corde, for orchestra. He composed also several works commissioned by institutions and associations such as: RAI, Accademia Nazionale di Santa Cecilia, Biennale di Venezia, Ravenna Festival, Ville de Genève, Fondazione Malipiero, Centro Studi Armando Gentilucci, Maggio Musicale Fiorentino, Nuova Consonanza.

While his early works have been influenced by Donatoni, to which he devoted also an extensive analytical study, Mauro Cardi soon developed his individual style, focusing his research on "musical forms moulded by timbre and sound intuitions, with unexpectedly expressive moments". 
His poetics reflects his natural aptitude to contrapuntal writing and his fascination with logic and the symbolic value of numbers, attracted to the playful dimension involved in composing.

He composed two radio operas commissioned by RAI: in 1994 Temperatura esterna on a text by Michele Mari and, in 1996, La mia puntualità fu un capolavoro on a text by Marco Lodoli. In 1995, on a commission by the Accademia Filarmonica Romana, he composed his first opera, Nessuna Coincidenza, one-act stage action with music. In 1998 BMG Ricordi published the monographic CD Manao Tupupau, containing his major works of the 1990th. From 2000 to 2008, on a commission of the 52nd Biennale di Venezia, he composed Oggetto d'amore, a cycle of seven musical scenes on texts by Pasquale Panella, premiered in Venezia and published in CD format by RAI Trade in 2009, which concludes his long collaboration with Sonia Bergamasco and the Freon Ensemble. In 2019 Mauro Cardi returns to musical theater with Il Diario di Eva, a semi-scenic opera for dancer / actress, soprano and ensemble, on a text freely taken from the homonymous story by Mark Twain (GAMO International Festival, Certosa di Firenze) and in 2021 he composed, on a libretto by Guido Barbieri, the one-act and six chapters opera Le ossa di Cartesio, for actor, three singers and large ensemble, commissioned by Opera InCanto, performed in Terni and Rome for Nuova Consonanza.

Since the 1990s, he has been involved in electroacoustic and computer music, collaborating with the electroacoustic music centres Agon in Milan, Centro Ricerche Musicali in Rome, Istituto Gramma in L'Aquila. In 1995 was chosen by IRCAM for the international stage, in 1997 Manao Tupupao has been selected as a finalist at the 24th Electroacustique Music Competition of Bourges, and in 2009 Alba, for zarb and electronics, was chosen by the International Computer Music Conference of Belfast. In 2001, he joined the composers collective Edison Studio in Rome, one of the most active centres for production of electroacoustic music in Italy, with which he experimented a collective composing practice. In 2008, Edison Studio published its first DVD, resulting from the collaboration with the video makers Latini and Di Domenico. In the following years it realized the live soundtracks for the silent movies: Gli ultimi giorni di Pompei (1913) by Eleuterio Rodolfi, Ricatto (Blackmail, 1929) by Alfred Hitchcock, Inferno (1911) by Francesco Bertolini, Giuseppe de Liguoro e Adolfo Padovan (awarded the "Premio speciale AITS per il migliore suono anno 2011"‚ by the Associazione Italiana Tecnici del Suono), Das Cabinet des Dr. Caligari  (1919) by Robert Wiene. In 2011 and 2016 these two soundtracks have been published on DVD in 5.1 surround version by the Cineteca di Bologna in the "Il Cinema ritrovato" series. A study has been published on Edison Studio's works: "Il silent film e l'elettronica in relazione intermediale", edited by Marco Maria Gazzano. With Edison Studio, Mauro Cardi participated in the International Computer Music Conference 2002 (Gothenburg) and 2003 (Singapore).

Since 2021 Mauro Cardi has been on the executive committee of Nuova Consonanza from 1988, of which he has been President from 1999 to 2001. Founding member of the "Scuola popolare di musica di Testaccio" (Rome), he has taught Composition at the Conservatories of L'Aquila and Florence and from 2021 at the Conservatory “Santa Cecilia” in Rome. He gives seminars and composition workshops in Italy and abroad.

Mauro Cardi's compositions have been published by: Casa Ricordi, RAI Trade, Curci, Edipan, Ut Orpheus, Semar, Sconfinarte, Taukay; and have been recorded by the labels: Ricordi, RCA, BMG Ariola, Nuova Fonit Cetra, RAI Trade, Edipan, Adda Records, Happy New Ears, Il manifesto, CNI, Taukay.

Works

Musical theatre and movies
2021 Le ossa di Cartesio, for actor, three singers and large ensemble, libretto by Giulio Barbieri 
2019 Il Diario di Eva, for female dancer/actress, soprano and ensemble, libretto by composer and Cristina Papi, based on Mark Twain's story of the same name
2014 En dirigeable sur le champs de bataille, live computer soundtrack for the BBC's documentary of the same name, with Edison Studio
2013 Blackmail, live computer soundtrack for the 1929 movie of the same name by Alfred Hitchcock, with Edison Studio
2008 Oggetto d'amore, for female voice, ensemble, video and electronics, on texts by Pasquale Panella
2008 Inferno, live computer soundtrack for the movie of the same name by F.Bertolini, G.De Liguoro e A.Padovano, with Edison Studio
2008 Medea incontra Norma, based loosely on Medea of Luigi Cherubini and Norma of Vincenzo Bellini, with Luigi Ceccarelli, ideazione e regia di Cristina Mazzavillani Muti
2004 Trash, "musicalopera" for actors, singers and electronics, on texts by Francesca Angeli, music co-author:  Roberta Vacca
2003 Das cabinet des Dr.Caligari, live computer soundtrack for the movie of the same name by, with Edison Studio
2001 Gli ultimi giorni di Pompei, live computer soundtrack pfor the movie of the same name by, with Edison Studio
2000 C'era una volta... la principessa dispettosa, on text by Nicoletta Costa, for narrator and electronics, music co-authors: Maria Cristina De Amicis, Michelangelo Lupone, Alessandro Sbordoni, Roberta Vacca
1995 Nessuna Coincidenza, one-act stage action with music, for 2 sopranos, tenore/narrator, actor, ensemble, tape and live electronics

Radio dramas
1996 La mia puntualità fu un capolavoro, 20 radiofilm, for 2 narrators and tape, on texts by Marco Lodoli
1994 Temperatura esterna, for narrator, flutes, percussions, MIDI and electronics, on texts by Michele Mari

Orchestra
2019 Sinfonia (après Haydn 104), for orchestra
2008 Stanza 19, for narrator and orchestra, on texts by Jorge Luis Borges 
2001 Hallelujah, for soli, choir and orchestra
2000 Timordime, for narrator and orchestra, on texts by Pier Paolo Pasolini
1999 Spleen, for piano and orchestra
1997 Lisbon revisited, for narrator and orchestra, on texts by Fernando Pessoa
1989 Arcipelaghi, for orchestra
1983–85 In corde, for orchestra
1982 Melos, for soprano and orchestra

Wind orchestra
2011 Parafrasi L (après Liszt), for piano and symphonic band
2004 Eikon, for large wind orchestra and electronics
1995 A Poison Pen, for electric guitar, soli and wind orchestra

Chamber music
2020 Toy (Piano) Stories, Games #4, for Toy Piano and obbligato flute
2019 Quanto pesa una lacrima?, for female voice, violin, guitar, double bass and percussion, on "A inventare i numer" from "Favole al telefono" by Gianni Rodari
2018 Miroir, for six percussionists and two marimbas
2018 Arethusa, for narrator, soprano and ensemble, on texts by Ovid
2017 R.Bow, for two electric guitar and bass guitar
2017 La Follia, for viola (and viola d'amore) and string orchestra
2017 Berceuse, for flute, guitar, viola and cello
2016 QO, Games #2, for piccolo quartet 
2016 ES, for flute and piano
2015 Stelutis, for ensemble of 15 instruments
2015 Item, for two flutists
2014 Zone 2.0, for sax alto and electronics
2014 Zone, for sax contralto
2014 Il vento, dopo l'ultimo treno, extract from "Badenheim 1939″ by Aharon Appelfeld, for narrator and ensemble
2013 Asa nisi masa, for narrator and ensemble
2013 Bazzle!, Games #1, for piano four-hands
2012 I luoghi comuni non-sono segnati sulle carte, for horn, violin, double bass, piano, recorded voices, dancers and live electronics, music co-authors: Luigi Ceccarelli, Fabio Cifariello Ciardi
2012 Venenum, for cello and piano 
2011 Pastelli sul Pack 2, for flutes and live electronics
2011 Timordime 2, for ensemble 
2011 Arabesque, for flute (piccolo, G flute), oboe and piano
2010 Bagatella, for guitar 
2009 Tellus 6.3, for eight strings and four percussionists
2009 Due pezzi futuristi, for baritone, oboe and accordion
2008 Breamptu, for accordion and guitar
2007 Non si parla che d'aria, from the cycle Oggetto d'amore, for narrator, trumpet, percussions, double bass, on texts by Pasquale Panella
2007 Noi siamo la materia che sussulta, from the cycle Oggetto d'amore, for narrator, trumpet, electric guitar, percussions, double bass and electronics on texts by Pasquale Panella
2007 Un gioco a incastro, from the cycle Oggetto d'amore, for vocalist, trumpet, electric guitar, percussions, double bass and electronics on texts by Pasquale Panella
2007 Le Parole da sola, from the cycle Oggetto d'amore, for narrator, trumpet, electric guitar, percussions and double bass on texts by Pasquale Panella
2007 Caro cara, from the cycle Oggetto d'amore, for two narrators, tape and electronics on texts by Pasquale Panella
2007 Breath, for accordion and live electronics
2006 Sarastro, for flute, clarinet, violin and cello
2006 I Piatti della Bilancia, actress, tape and electronics, on a text by Rosaria Lo Russo
2006 Pastelli sul Pack, for flutes
2005 No sap chantar qui so non-di, for female voice and ensemble, on a text by Jaufré Rudel
2004 Souffle 1.2 (from Petrassi), for flute and ensemble
2004 Musica mundana, for narrator and plucked trio, on a text taken from De Institutione Musica of Severino Boezio
2003 Polvere di luna, for narrator and electronics, on texts by Sonia Bergamasco
2003 Child, for bass clarinet
2003 Fil, for bass clarinet
2003 Le parole e il sale, from the cycle Oggetto d'amore, for voice and electric guitar, on texts by Pasquale Panella
2002 Alba, for zarb and electronics
2002 Prima Sonata, for piano
2002 The Moving Moon, for coloratura soprano and strings on texts by Samuel T. Coleridge
2001 Su questa trama (per non-dire l'Otello), for narrator and ensemble, drama and libretto by Vittorio Sermonti
2001 Allegoria dell'isola, for soprano and harpsichord, on texts by Francesco Pennisi
2001 Klon, for trumpet, percussions and double bass 
2000 Altrove con il suo nome, from the cycle Oggetto d'amore, for actress and electronics, on texts by Pasquale Panella
2000 Altre Geografie, for five instruments
2000 Impromptu, for guitar
2000 Il fondo dell'acqua è disseminato di stelle, for two pianos
1998 Das Papier, for soprano, baritone, string quartet and electronics, on texts by Wolfgang Amadeus Mozart
1998 ...plena timoris amor, for soprano and piano, on texts by Ovid
1998 Chat, for clarinet and cello
1998 Luz, for jazz trio and ensemble
1997 Levar, for ensemble
1997 Fil rouge, for piano and string trio 
1996 Manao tupapau, for flute, percussions, tape and live electronics, finalist at the 24° Electroacustique Music Competition of Bourges
1996 Luna lunae..., for six instruments
1996 The Spark to the Flame, for seven instruments
1996 Fado, for six instruments
1995 Stream, for sax quartet
1995 Vocativo, for cello
1994 Nuages, for seven instruments
1993 E la notte rischiarava la notte, for three MIDI keyboards and live electronics
1993 Al di sopra del lago è il vento, for viola and piano
1992 Wind, for recorders and harp
1992 Horus, for three percussionists
1992 Fantasie, for string orchestra
1991 Lettura di un'onda, for viola and guitar
1991 Certo moto d'ignoto tormento, for piano and double quintet
1991 Das Alte Jahr Vergangen ist, for two harpsichords
1991 Gusci di mago, for string orchestra
1990 Calendari indiani, for female voice and ten instruments, on traditional texts by Native Americans
1990 Libra (vers.b), for vibraphone and tape
1990 Per il Teatro di Documenti, for clarinet
1990 Ottetto (après Stravinsky), for wind instruments
1989 Der Trank (ist's, der mir taugt!), for piano and six instruments
1989 Effetto Notte, for eight instruments
1988 Terza Texture, for flute, bass clarinet and piano
1987 Libra, for vibraphone
1987 Gotico, for harpsichord and string quartet
1987 Mizar, for double bass
1986 Promenade: Variazioni sul blu, for seven instruments, works premiered at the Tribuna Internazionale dei Compositori 1987
1986 Texture, for two guitars
1986 Myricae, for flute, cello and piano
1986 Silete Venti, for guitar and ensemble
1985 Bianco, for guitar
1985 Trama, for violin
1985 Volute, for wind quintet and piano
1984 Filigrana, for eight instruments, selected by International Gaudeamus MusicWeek 1986
1984 Trio (le claire sillage), for violin, cello and piano
1984 Quartetto per archi
1984 (rev. 1992) Sciarada, for clarinet, viola, cello and piano
1983 Natura morta, for piano
1983 Partita per nove, for nine instruments
1983 Les Masques: Quattro Capricci for flute, viola and guitar, International Gaudeamus Preize 1984
1982 R.I.B.E.S., for female voice
1982 Aube, for guitar

A cappella choir
1992 M'al vento ne portava le parole, for vocal quartet on a text by Francesco Petrarca

Transcriptions 
1998 Il fanciullo e gli incantesimi, transcription from L'Enfant et les Sortileges of Maurice Ravel, for narrator, choir and ensemble, co-authors: Giulio Castagnoli, Matteo D'Amico
2000 Canoni 1–5, transcription from L'offerta musicale, Canoni enigmatici, of Johann Sebastian Bach, for ensemble, co-authors: Giulio Castagnoli, Gabriele Manca

Discography

Dvd with edison studio
2016 Das Cabinet des Dr.Caligari, a movie by Robert Wiene (1920), DVD Cineteca di Bologna 2016, "Il cinema ritrovato", DVD-Booklet, soundtrack by Edison Studio
2011 Inferno, by Francesco Bertolini, Adolfo Padovan and Giuseppe De Liguoro (1911), DVD Cineteca di Bologna 2011, "Il cinema ritrovato", DVD-Booklet, soundtrack by Edison Studio
2007 Altrove con il suo nome, video by Silvia di Domenico and Giulio Latini, in "Edison Studio" (2007) – DVD Auditorium EdiLDC278 1139/40, co-production Edison Studio – Cemat

Monographic cd
2009 Oggetto d'amore, seven musical scenes for voices, instruments, video and electronics, Sonia Bergamasco, voice, Freon ensemble, on texts by Pasquale Panella, RTC023 – 2009 – RAI Trade
1998 Manao Tupapau, CMRCD1053, Ricordi Oggi – BMG Ricordi

Works included in cd
2017 Pastelli sul Pack, in "Fabula ut", Stradivarius STR 37067, Arcadio Baracchi, flutes
2017 Arabesque, in "New music for flute, oboe and piano", Edizioni Taukay 162, Ecoensemble Trio
2014 Bagatella, in "Paganini 2013 – Ghiribizzi", Edizioni Sinfonica A – 337, Luigi Attademo, guitar
2010 Breath, Edizioni Curci Milano E.C. 11695, Francesco Gesualdi, accordion, Mauro Cardi, elettronics
2009 Pastelli sul Pack, Edizioni Curci Milano E.C. 11667, Arcadio Baracchi, flutes
2008 Melos, in "Dedicated to Pierrot", Puncta PNCD 0308, Joan Logue, soprano, Orchestra Sinfonica della RAI di Roma, cond. D.Shallon
2006 Klon, in "Italian News", RAI Trade RTC 012, Freon Ensemble 
2006 Alba, in "Zarbing", Edizioni LaFrontiera (LFDL 19401) e Rai Trade (RTP0090), Mahamad Ghavi-Helm, zarb
2005 Polvere di luna, Armando Curcio Editore & Eurografica, Sonia Bergamasco, voice
2005 Child, in "Suono Sonda N.3 – Giugno 2004", Rocco Parisi, bass clarinet
2001 Vocativo, in "Musica per la Resistenza 1995", Rocco Parisi, bass clarinet
1996 The Spark to the Flame, in "Scuola popolare di Musica di Testaccio – Musica per la Libertà", Il Manifesto CD 004, Freon ensemble
1994 Al di sopra del lago è il vento, in "Musica Presente 4 – CDC 503", 1994 Nuova Fonit Cetra – Dischi Ricordi, Ensemble Contrechamps
1993 Wind, in "'900 Musica – 74321 16229-2", 1993 BMG Ariola, Alterego ensemble
1992 Effetto notte, in "Garden of earthly desire", CRMCD 1020 1992 Dischi Ricordi, Elision ensemble, conductor Sandro Gorli
1991 Aube, PAN CDC 3009 1990 CD Edipan, Stefano Cardi, guitar
1990 Volute, in "L'Artisanat furieux ensemble", PAN CDC 3010 1990 CD Edipan, L'Artisanat Furieux Ensemble, conductor Tonino Battista
1989 Filigrana, in "Musique Transalpines vol.2 ", CCS 590014 1990 – Centre de Crèation Sonore, Adda Records, Gruppo strumentale Musica d'oggi, conductor Fabio Maestri
1989 Terza Texture, in "Musica nuova in Italia", CD Happy New Ears 2 – CA 911, Het Trio

Works included in lp
1987 Texture, Bianco in "Contempolinea Due – La chitarra ", SP 10098 1987 Disco RCA, Duo Chitarristico Romano, Stefano Cardi, guitar
1986 Trio (le claire sillage), in "1986 La Musica – n.12 – LM 86-2", 1986 Dischi Edipan, Nuove Forme Sonore ensemble

References

Bibliography
Issues on Mauro Cardi
"Cardi, Mauro", in AA.VV., Dizionario Enciclopedico della Musica e dei Musicisti, diretto da Alberto Basso, volume Appendice; Utet, Torino, 1990, p. 14
"Cardi, Mauro", in AA.VV., Dizionario Enciclopedico della Musica e dei Musicisti, diretto da Alberto Basso, volume Appendice 2005; Utet, Torino, 2004, p. 105
"Cardi, Mauro", in AA.VV., Enciclopedia della musica Garzanti, Milano, 1996, p. 141
"Cardi, Mauro", in AA.VV., International Who's who in Music, 12.a ed.1990; AAVV., consultant editor David Cummings, IBC Cambridge, p. 120
"Cardi, Mauro", in AA.VV., Enciclopedia della Musica, diretta da Marco Drago e Andrea Boroli, Istituto Geografico De Agostini, Novara, 1995, p. 184
"Cardi, Mauro", in AA.VV., Autoanalisi dei compositori italiani contemporanei, vol.I, a cura di Alberta Cataldi, Flavio Pagano, Napoli, 1992, pp. 148–152
Marco Maria Gazzano (a cura di), con scritti di G.Barbieri, R.Calabretto, S.Miceli e altri, Edison Studio. Il Silent Film e l'Elettronica in Relazione Intermediale, Exorma, Roma, 2014, 
Carlo Boschi, "Presence of Romantic Elements in the Work of Contemporary Italian Composers", in Romanticism as an Attitude. Actes du séminaire organisé dans le cadre du projet européen Roads of Romanticism, Strasbourg, Èditions du Conservatoire 2007, pp. 35–50
Renzo Cresti, Verso il 2000, Dick Peerson, Napoli-Pisa, 1990, pp. 34–35
Renzo Cresti, Mauro Cardi, Scrittura e artigianato, in Musica presente. Tendenze e compositori di oggi, LIM, Lucca, 2019, ISBN 978-88-5543-001-2, pp.174-178
Luca Conti, "Mauro Cardi: l'artigianato del comporre", in Idea, Anno XXVI, N.6–7, Roma, Giugno-Luglio 1990, pp. 33–39
Issues by Mauro Cardi
"Il computer per il compositore: slave o master? Su alcune risorse, e le conseguenti problematiche, che pongono le nuove tecnologie applicate alla composizione musicale", in Musica/Tecnologia, n.4 – 2010, Firenze University Press, pp. 63–67
"Condividere la tela. Il live cinema di Edison Studio per Inferno", (con Ceccarelli L., Cifariello Ciardi F., Cipriani A.,), in Le arti del suono n.3/2010, Edizioni Orizzonti Meridionali, Napoli, 2010, pp. 103–123
"Atono conforta grandi. Uno studio su Argot di Franco Donatoni e di alcune problematiche della composizione algoritmica" (in due parti), in Suono Sonda, Anno 4, N° 7, Febbraio 2009, Anno 4, N° 8, Novembre 2009, Joker, Genova, 2009
"Nuove tecnologie e composizione collettiva per il cinema muto", (con Ceccarelli L., Cifariello Ciardi F., Cipriani A.), in Close Up, Anno X, N°18, Marzo-Giugno 2006, Kaplan, Torino, 2006, pp. 81–102
"Notazione e pensiero musicale", in Progetto Grafico, Anno 4, N°7, Gennaio 2006, Associazione italiana progettazione per la comunicazione visiva, Roma, 2006, pp. 27–29
"Collective composition: the case of Edison Studio", (con Ceccarelli L., Cifariello Ciardi F., Cipriani A.), in Organised Sound 9/3, Cambridge University Press, 2004, pp. 261–270
"Child", in Suono Sonda, Anno 2, N° 1, Giugno 2004, Genova, 2004, pp. 25–33
"Il live electronics", (con Ceccarelli L.), in Il complesso di Elettra, Cidim, Roma, 1995, pp. 49–52
"Il grado Xerox della cultura", in Suonosud, N° 22, Autunno 1994, Ismez, Roma, 1994, pp. 20–26

External links
  Sito web ufficiale di Mauro Cardi
 Edison Studio
 Nuova Consonanza
 Stichting Gaudeamus Muziekweek
 IMD Internationales Musikinstitut Darmstadt

Pages translated from Italian Wikipedia
Italian classical composers
20th-century Italian composers
20th-century classical composers
21st-century classical composers
Avant-garde composers
1955 births
Living people
Electroacoustic music composers
Musicians from Rome